Kiribati competed at the 2017 Asian Indoor and Martial Arts Games held in Ashgabat, Turkmenistan from September 17-27. Kiribati sent a delegation of 12 competitors in 3 different sports. Kiribati couldn't receive any medal at the Games.

Kiribati made its first appearance at an Asian Indoor and Martial Arts Games for the first time along with other Oceania nations.

Participants

References 

Nations at the 2017 Asian Indoor and Martial Arts Games
ASia
Kiribati at multi-sport events